Weeks House may refer to:

in the United States (by state then city)
 Weeks House (Brooksville, Florida)
 Weeks–Kimbrough House, Talbotton, Talbot County, Georgia
 Barzillai Weeks House, Barnstable, Barnstable County, Massachusetts
 Kotthoff-Weeks Farm Complex, Hermann, Gasconade County, Missouri
 Weeks House (Greenland, New Hampshire), Rockingham County
 Weeks Estate, Lancaster, Coos County, New Hampshire
 Charles M. Weeks House, Huntington, Suffolk County, New York
 Weeks House, on the National Register of Historic Places listings in Wichita County, Texas 
 Charles H. Weeks House, Salt Lake City, Utah
 John C. Weeks House (better known as the Whittemore House (Washington, D.C.))